Roscoe Tanner was the defending champion, but lost in the second round this year.

John McEnroe won the title, defeating Jimmy Connors 6–3, 6–3, 6–1 in the final.

Seeds

  John McEnroe (champion)
  Jimmy Connors (final)
  Vitas Gerulaitis (semifinals)
  Roscoe Tanner (second round)
  Johan Kriek (first round)
  Sandy Mayer (quarterfinals)
  Wojtek Fibak (first round)
  Brian Gottfried (first round)

Draw

Finals

Top half

Bottom half

References

 Main Draw

U.S. Pro Indoor
1982 Grand Prix (tennis)